Frederick Lindstrom may refer to:

 Freddie Lindstrom (1905–1981), American baseball player
 Frederick B. Lindstrom (1915–1998), American academic; professor of sociology
 Fredrik Lindström (writer) (born 1963), Swedish film director, radio and TV presenter, writer, linguist and comedy performer
 Fredrik Lindström (biathlete) (born 1989), Swedish biathlete
 Fredrik Olaus Lindström (1847–1919), Swedish architect